Following the Sun may refer to:

 "Following the Sun" (Enigma song), released in 2003
 "Following the Sun" (Super-Hi and Neeka song), released in 2020